Předboj  is a municipality and village in Prague-East District in the Central Bohemian Region of the Czech Republic. It has about 1,200 inhabitants.

References

Villages in Prague-East District